John Legg is a former association football player who represented New Zealand at international level.

Legg made his full All Whites debut in a 3–5 loss to Australia on 5 November 1967 and ended his international playing career with 12 A-international caps and 2 goals to his credit, his final cap an appearance in a 1–1 draw with Macao on 5 November 1975.

References

External links

Year of birth missing (living people)
Living people
New Zealand association footballers
New Zealand international footballers

Association footballers not categorized by position